Man from Delmonte were an independent band from Manchester, England, formed in the mid-1980s.

History
Band members included Mike West (vocals and acoustic guitar), Sheila Seal (bass), Martin Vincent (guitar), and Howard Goody (drums).

The band members had little in common with most Manchester bands. Goody was a graduate of Winchester School of Art. Vincent had been an art critic and painter. Seal, a Glaswegian, was a classically trained musician who had run an art gallery. And West, who wrote the songs, was the Australian-born son of the author Morris West.

The band played many gigs at the Boardwalk club, in Manchester, where they recorded their Big Noise live album in 1989.

They took their name from a series of 1980s television advertisements for Del Monte fruit juices, featuring the "man from Del Monte". In these, the man would visit villages to sample their fruit juices, to see if they were good enough to be included in his company's drinks. The tagline, shouted jubilantly by a villager on approval was, "The man from Del Monte, he say 'Yes!'"'.

At one point they were managed by the journalist Jon Ronson.

After they split up in 1990, some members continued as Surfurbia. West moved to New Orleans to pursue a solo career in the early 1990s.

Discography
Chart placings shown are from the UK Indie Chart.

Singles
"Drive, Drive, Drive" (Ugly Man, 1987)
"Water in My Eyes" (Ugly Man, 1987)
"Will Nobody Save Louise" (Ugly Man, 1988) (#13)
Monday Morning After EP (Bop Cassettes, 1989)
"Big Noise" (Bop Cassettes, 1989) (#20)
"My Love Is Like A Gift You Can't Return" (Bop Cassettes, 1989) (#13)

Albums
Catholic Boys on Mobilettes (Bop Cassettes, 1989) – compilation
Big Noise (Bop Cassettes, 1989)
Big Noise (Vinyl Japan, 2000) – reissue
The Good Things in Life (Vinyl Japan, 1999) – compilation

References

External links
Mike West
Man from Delmonte Fan Page
Truckstop Honeymoon

English pop music groups
Musical groups from Manchester
British indie pop groups